The collinearity equations are a set of two equations, used in photogrammetry and computer stereo vision, to relate coordinates in a sensor plane (in two dimensions) to object coordinates (in three dimensions). The equations originate from the central projection of a point of the object through the optical centre of the camera to the image on the sensor plane.

Definition
Let x,y, and z refer to a  coordinate system with the x- and y-axis in the sensor plane. Hence:

These coordinates may be transformed through a rotation and a translation to the system on the camera. The translation doesn't influence the differences of the coordinates, and the rotation, often called camera transform, is given by a 3×3-matrix R, transforming  into:

and 

Substitution of these expressions, leads to a set of two equations, known as the collinearity equations:

The most obvious use of these equations is for images recorded by a camera.  In this case the equation describes transformations from object space (X, Y, Z) to image coordinates (x, y).  It forms the basis for the equations used in bundle adjustment. 
They indicate that the image point (on the sensor plate of the camera), the observed point (on the object) and the projection center of the camera were aligned when the picture was taken.

See also
3D projection
Epipolar geometry
Pinhole camera model

References

Photogrammetry
Geometry in computer vision